Lake Apanás is a reservoir located in northern Nicaragua and formed by Mancotal Dam on the Tuma River to the north of Jinotega department (border with Honduras). The reservoir has an area of 45.90 square kilometres.

It is a source of much of nation's hydropower for the Centro América Power Plant.

References

Apanas, Lake
Ramsar sites in Nicaragua
Jinotega Department